Charity Island may refer to:

 Charity Island (Michigan), United States
 Charity Island (Tasmania), Australia

See also
 Little Charity Island, Lake Huron, Michigan